Dr. Lúcio Lima Airport , is the airport serving Crateús, Brazil.

Airlines and destinations

Access

See also

List of airports in Brazil

References

External links

Airports in Ceará